Guram (Khita) Kutateladze (Georgian: გურამ (ხიტა) ქუთათელაძე) (March 29, 1924 – November 29, 1979) was a 20th-century Georgian painter. Honoured Artist of Georgia, Rustaveli Prize. He studied at the Moscow School of Painting, Sculpture and Architecture (1940-1942, 1946) and the Tbilisi State Academy of Arts (1942-1946).

External links 
 Georgian Art Portal

References 

 ლეჟავა, სამსონ  (2016) "გურამ ქუთათელაძე". Lezhava, Samson "Guram Kutateladze". pp.17–49. Tbilisi /  (Georgian)
 ანდრიაძე, დავით  (2011) "ხიტა ქუთათელაძე". Andriadze, David "Hita Kutateladze". pp.7-46. Tbilisi /  (Georgian)

 
20th-century painters from Georgia (country)
Artists from Tbilisi
Tbilisi State Academy of Arts alumni
1924 births
1979 deaths
Soviet painters
Moscow School of Painting, Sculpture and Architecture alumni